Salah Goudjil is an Algerian politician, belonging to the Secretariat of the Executive Committee of the National Liberation Front (FLN). He took part in the Algerian War of Independence against France. Goudjil has served as Minister of Transport and Fishing in various FLN cabinets.

Living people
Year of birth missing (living people)
Place of birth missing (living people)
National Liberation Front (Algeria) politicians
Government ministers of Algeria
Members of the Council of the Nation
21st-century Algerian people